Bryan Henry Farr (16 March 1924 - 20 May 2017) was an English cricketer and landowner.  Farr was a right-handed batsman who bowled right-arm medium pace.  He was born at Nottingham, Nottinghamshire, and was educated at Harrow School.

Farr made his first-class debut for Nottinghamshire against Gloucestershire in the 1949 County Championship.  He made five further first-class appearances for the county, the last of which came against Derbyshire in the 1951 County Championship.  In his six first-class appearances for the county, he scored 127 runs at an average of 15.87, with a high score of 37.  With the ball, he took 10 wickets at a bowling average of 48.50, with best figures of 5/96.  These figures were his only five wicket haul and came against Worcestershire in 1951.  He played a final first-class match in 1952 for the Free Foresters against Cambridge University, going wicketless and being dismissed twice by Raman Subba Row, with the Free Foresters losing the match by an innings and 86 runs.

References

External links
 
 

1924 births
2017 deaths
Cricketers from Nottingham
People educated at Harrow School
English cricketers
Nottinghamshire cricketers
Free Foresters cricketers